Salam Cafe is an Australian comedy talk show. Produced by RMITV, and originally airing on Channel 31 from 31 April 2005 under the title Ramadan TV, the show began a revamped ten-week run on the SBS from 7 May 2008. Hosted by Ahmed Imam and starring various Muslim panellists, including Waleed Aly and Susan Carland, the show presents a light hearted, humorous view on life as a Muslim in Australia through panel discussion and a series of sketches that lampoon the representation of Muslims in Australia and the Islamic way of life.

The show was filmed in front of a live audience in Sydney and Melbourne.

Awards
Salam Cafe has won various Antenna Awards, recognising outstanding community television programs broadcast on Channel 31 across Australia.

References

External links
Salam Cafe Official Website
Salam Cafe on SBS
Salam Cafe on Channel 31 (obsolete)

2005 Australian television series debuts
2008 Australian television series endings
Australian community access television shows
Special Broadcasting Service original programming
Australian television talk shows
Television series about Islam
RMITV productions